Mikael Sundström (10 September 1957 – 23 January 2001) was a five-time national champion rally driver, from Finland.

Racing record

Complete WRC results

Complete British Saloon Car Championship results
(key) (Races in bold indicate pole position; races in italics indicate fastest lap.)

References

1957 births
2001 deaths
Finnish rally drivers

Peugeot Sport drivers
World Rally Championship drivers